In 1987 summer, Milan bet on Dutch draft: Marco van Basten and Ruud Gullit came to brace the side. Coach role was given to Arrigo Sacchi, at his debut in Serie A. Rossoneri soon failed European aims, having - also - play home matches on neutral ground (Lecce) for San Siro disqualification (issued in 1986). They were beaten by Espanyol, in second round.

Domestic league gave better results, with side stable at second place in mid season. Retour half never saw Milan lose a game, for a trend that let him to recover points on Napoli. Reigning champions wasted a match-ball with 2 matches left, when Milan won 3–2 at their home. Following draws, against Juventus and Como, insured Scudetto. It was the first domestic title since 1979, the eleventh overall.

Squad

Transfers

Competitions

Serie A

League table

Results by round

Matches

Coppa Italia 

First round

Eightfinals

UEFA Cup 

First round

Second round

Statistics

Players statistics 
Appearances and goals in domestic league.

References

Sources
  RSSSF - Italy 1987/88

A.C. Milan seasons
Milan
Italian football championship-winning seasons